The chestnut-headed partridge (Arborophila cambodiana) is a bird species in the family Phasianidae. It is found in highland forest in Cambodia. Some taxonomists consider the Siamese partridge (A. diversa) conspecific.

Subspecies: 
The chestnut-headed partridge has two recognized subspecies:

 A. c. cambodiana (Delacour & Jabouille, 1928)
 A. c. chandamonyi (Eames J.C., Steinheimer, & Bansok, 2002)

References

External links
BirdLife Species Factsheet.

chestnut-headed partridge
Birds of Cambodia
chestnut-headed partridge
chestnut-headed partridge
Taxonomy articles created by Polbot